Khandan Bahadori castle is a historical castle located in Komijan County in Markazi Province, The longevity of this fortress dates back to the Qajar dynasty.

References 

Castles in Iran
Qajar castles